Romans is a 2017 British drama film directed by Ludwig Shammasian and Paul Shammasian and written by Geoff Thompson. The film stars Orlando Bloom, Janet Montgomery, Charlie Creed-Miles, Anne Reid, Alex Ferns and Josh Myers. The film premiered at the 2017 Edinburgh International Film Festival. In the United States, the film was released under the title Retaliation.

Cast 
Orlando Bloom as Malky
Janet Montgomery as Emma
Charlie Creed-Miles as Paul
Anne Reid as Mother	
Alex Ferns	as Jo
Josh Myers as Colin
James Smillie as Jimmy
Kyle Rees as Mick 
Rory Nolan as Billy 
Charlotte Powell as Lou

Production
On 10 November 2015 Orlando Bloom joined the cast of the film. On 27 November 2015 Janet Montgomery joined the cast of the film. Principal photography began on 16 November 2015.

Release
The film premiered at the Edinburgh International Film Festival on 1 July 2017. The film was released in North America as Retaliation on 24 July 2020.

References

External links
 
 

2017 films
2017 drama films
British drama films
2010s English-language films
2010s British films